John Day Putnam was a member of the Wisconsin State Assembly.

Biography
Putnam was born on June 19, 1837 in Brooklyn, Connecticut. He was a direct descendant (second great-grandson) of Israel Putnam. Putnam went on to reside in Troy, St. Croix County, Wisconsin. During the American Civil War, he served with the 1st Wisconsin Volunteer Infantry Regiment of the Union Army, eventually becoming the regiment's commissary sergeant. In 1874, Putnam moved to River Falls (town), Wisconsin. He died in 1904.

Political career
Putnam was a member of the Assembly in 1883. Other positions he held include Chairman (similar to Mayor), Treasurer and Assessor of Troy, Chairman of the town board (similar to city council) of River Falls and Chairman of the county board of Pierce County, Wisconsin. He was a Democrat.

References

1837 births
1904 deaths
People from Brooklyn, Connecticut
People from St. Croix County, Wisconsin
People from River Falls, Wisconsin
Democratic Party members of the Wisconsin State Assembly
Mayors of places in Wisconsin
Wisconsin city council members
County supervisors in Wisconsin
City and town treasurers in the United States
People of Wisconsin in the American Civil War
Union Army soldiers
John Day
19th-century American politicians